The Communauté de communes du Pays de l'Ourcq is a federation of municipalities (communauté de communes) in the Seine-et-Marne département and in the Île-de-France région of France. Established on 13 December 1973, its seat is Ocquerre. Its area is 234.7 km2, and its population was 17,546 in 2018.

Composition
The communauté de communes consists of the following 22 communes:

Armentières-en-Brie
Cocherel
Congis-sur-Thérouanne
Coulombs-en-Valois
Crouy-sur-Ourcq
Dhuisy
Douy-la-Ramée
Étrépilly
Germigny-sous-Coulombs
Isles-les-Meldeuses
Jaignes
Lizy-sur-Ourcq
Marcilly
Mary-sur-Marne
May-en-Multien
Ocquerre
Le Plessis-Placy
Puisieux
Tancrou
Trocy-en-Multien
Vendrest
Vincy-Manœuvre

See also
Communes of the Seine-et-Marne department

References

Ourcq
Ourcq